Gun smoke or gunsmoke refers to the smoke produced by a firearm. It may also refer to:

Film and TV
 Gunsmoke, an American radio and television drama
 Gun Smoke (1931 film), a Western
 Gun Smoke (1936 film), a Western
 Gun Smoke (1945 film), a Western
 Gunsmoke (film), a 1953 Western

Other
 Gunsmoke (aerial gunnery competition), a biennial air-to-surface gunnery meet hosted by the United States Air Force
 Gunsmoke (album), a 1996 album by Dogbowl and Kramer
 Gun.Smoke, an arcade game